Seredin is a Russian masculine surname derived from the word sreda, meaning Wednesday; its feminine counterpart is Seredina. It may refer to
Afanasy Seredin-Sabatin (1860–1921), Russian-born architect, steersman-pilot and reporter
Antonina Seredina (born 1929), Russian sprint canoer
Danylo Seredin, Ukrainian paralympic athlete 
Kristina Seredina (born 1994), Russian rugby sevens player
Sergei Seredin (born 1994), Russian football player 
Yevgeny Seredin (1958–2006), Russian swimmer

References

Russian-language surnames